Mudanza y Acarreo (Spanish for House Moving and haulage) Is the second album by songwriter and musician Juan Luis Guerra. This The album is widely known for making Juan Luis Guerra and 440 famous and launch to the national fame the group within its native Dominican Republic. It was the first album recorded with Mariadalia Herandez as member of the band. With this record, the group got radio airplay for the first time with songs like "Elena" and "Por eso Ahora" in Dominican Republic. "Si tu te vas", it is considered their first hit and was included in the Greatest Hits compilation Grandes Éxitos Juan Luis Guerra y 440 (1995) as bonus track.

Background 
The debut album Soplando (1984), received critical acclaim but did not receive much attention and was largely ignored by the general public and radio listeners. The lead singer of the group, Juan Luis Guerra and power-vocalist Maridalia Hernandez redefined 440’s sound to more traditional danceable merengue boundaries and made a more commercial turn to the band musical career. For many, Mundaza y Acarreo was the beginning of his commercial career. According to the Guerra himself, "Si tu te vas" was his first merengue song recorded ever. Also, the album contained the song "Dame" which is a Spanish version of "Don't Stop 'Til You Get Enough" by Michael Jackson.

Critical reception 
The album received positive reviews by the critics. Billboard magazine on the Latin section stated that "The Dominican smart set's fave, La 440, with its blend of doo-wop harmony and sharp-edged merengue dance beat, is smart indeed. Impeccable elegance and irresistible funk."

Commercial Performance 
In the United States,  debuted and peaked at number 17 on the Billboard Tropical Albums on the week of February 22, 1986, Becoming Guerra`s first entry in the chart. Also, it remained on the chart for seven consecutive weeks.

The album was supported by the released of the singles, "Si Tú Te Vas", "Elena", "Por Eso Ahora", "Ella Dice" y "Yo Vivo Enamorado". The lead single "Si tu te vas" was their first radio hit in the Dominican Republic.

Track listing

 Por Eso Ahora - 3:25
 Ella Dice - 3:36
 Yo Vivo Enamorado - 5:05
 Réquiem Sobre El Jaragua (le dién dinamita) - 3:16
 Si Tu Te Vas - 3:55
 Elena - 4:09
 Santiago En Coche - 4:03
 Dame - 4:12

Charts

References

External links
Juan Luis Guerra Discography

1985 albums
Juan Luis Guerra albums